Ligidium hypnorum is a species of woodlouse found across Europe and western Asia. It is dark and shiny, and is similar in appearance to the common species Philoscia muscorum, and also the rarer Oritoniscus flavus. In Great Britain, it was first discovered at Copthorne Common, Surrey, in 1873, and most later records are also from South East England. It is considered a good indicator species for ancient woodland.

Disease
Prior to the recognition of Invertebrate iridescent virus 31 (IIV-31) in 1980, blue individuals of L. hypnorum had been discovered, which were interpreted to be new subspecies, and were described as such: L. hypnorum coeruleum Lereboullet 1843 and L. hypnorum amethystinum Schöbl 1861 (in reference to cerulean and amethyst, respectively). These cases have since been reinterpreted, not as distinct taxonomic entities, but as historical findings of individuals infected with IIV-31.

See also
 List of woodlice of the British Isles

References

External links
 

Woodlice
Crustaceans described in 1792
Taxa named by Georges Cuvier